Splendrillia hedleyi is a species of sea snail, a marine gastropod mollusk in the family Drilliidae.

Description

Distribution
This marine species is endemic to Australia and occurs off Queensland.

References

 Wells, Fred E. "Revision of the Recent Australian Turridae referred to the genera Splendrillia and Austrodrillia." Journal of the Malacological Society of Australia 11.1 (1990): 73–117.

External links
  Tucker, J.K. 2004 Catalog of recent and fossil turrids (Mollusca: Gastropoda). Zootaxa 682:1–1295.

hedleyi
Gastropods described in 1990
Gastropods of Australia